The 1942 Kilkenny Senior Hurling Championship was the 48th staging of the Kilkenny Senior Hurling Championship since its establishment by the Kilkenny County Board.

On 26 July 1942, Carrickshock won the championship after a 3-02 to 2-03 defeat of Threecastles in the final. It was their fifth championship title overall and their third title in succession. They were the first team to win three titles in-a-row.

Results

Final

References

Kilkenny Senior Hurling Championship
Kilkenny Senior Hurling Championship